Cartel is an American pop punk band from Conyers, Georgia, United States, that formed in 2003. The group was featured on the MTV television series Band in a Bubble in 2007 as part of an experiment where they were given 20 days to write and record a full album. The current members of the band include vocalist/bassist Will Pugh, lead guitarist Joseph Pepper, guitarist Nic Hudson, and drummer Kevin Sanders. In April 2020, Pugh released an EP for a new side project, TAURIDS, with fellow Nashville residents Bobby Holland and Adam Bokesch—both musicians and audio producers/engineers from the band The Daybreaks.

History

Member backgrounds
Nic Hudson was born on July 6, 1982 in Conyers, Georgia. Hudson has played rhythm guitar for the band since late 2004 until bassist Jeff Lett left in 2011. Hudson took over as the band's bassist until 2012, then switched back to rhythm guitar.
Joseph Pepper is the lead guitarist of Cartel. Pepper was born on May 15, 1983, in Tucson, Arizona, but moved to Conyers, Georgia, as a child. Pepper learned to play guitar early in his life and discovered that he wanted to pursue a career as a musician. His first playing experiences were at a small family church in Conyers. He met Will Pugh and Kevin Sanders in high school.
Will Pugh was born on May 4, 1984, in Conyers, Georgia, and is the lead singer, lyricist, and current bassist of the band. Pugh met the other three members of Cartel as a student at Heritage High School. After graduating from Heritage, Pugh spent a year at Georgia State University in Atlanta, then transferred to the University of Georgia in Athens for his sophomore year of college. He left UGA after the 2003–04 school year to record and promote his band's first full-length album, Chroma. In 2008, he married longtime girlfriend, Caitlin. An avid golfer since the age of seven, Pugh plays when he has a free moment with bandmates Kevin Sanders and Nic Hudson, and he also follows the career of professional golfer Tiger Woods. Pugh also builds and custom fits golf clubs for himself and others.
Kevin Sanders is Cartel's drummer. He was born on October 9, 1982 in DeKalb County, Georgia, and grew up in Conyers, Georgia. He started playing the trumpet in 1995 and picked up the drums during Christmas 1996. He plays SJC Drums. While he is shown playing a DW kit in the "Honestly" Video, he switched shortly after that. He has used many different kits handcrafted by SJC. His current set-up for the Cartel (album) tour is an Amber Acrylic SJC Kit. The set is equipped with gold glitter "revolutionary hoops", teardrop lugs, and Gauger Dynamounts. Sanders uses Pro-Mark 5B Hickory Drumsticks.

Early years and Chroma (2003–2006)
The five band members of Cartel grew up in Rockdale County, Georgia, and Cartel was formed in late 2003 while they were attending Georgia State University. In 2003 Chris Black (aka Done To Death) started managing Cartel. The band built a strong fan base and eventually was signed to The Militia Group, an independent record company in Long Beach, California, releasing their EP The Ransom. Around this time personal differences between Andy Lee and the rest of the band came to a head; and he was replaced as guitarist by band friend Nic Hudson. With their new lineup, the band released their first full-length album, Chroma, in September 2005. The pop punk album was powered by the melodic hits of "Say Anything (Else)" and "Honestly".

The band grew in popularity putting them on Alternative Press’s 2005 list for “Bands You Need to Know”. They were also named Yahoo! Music’s winner in the March 2006 ”Who’s Next” competition. In April 2006 Cartel signed with Epic Records, then from late 2006 until early 2007 they acted as touring support for New Found Glory with The Early November and Hit The Lights. Progressing from local shows, they kicked off a headlining tour featuring bands Cobra Starship, Boys Like Girls, Quietdrive, New Atlantic and Permanent Me. On June 8, 2006, Ryan Roberts, the band's bass player, decided to leave the band. Cartel has noted it was an "amicable" breakup. An old friend of the band, Jeff Lett, joined as a replacement for Roberts.

The band continued, re-releasing their debut album Chroma under Epic Records. The new release is packaged with a live EP Live Dudes. After the re-release, "Say Anything (Else)" was featured in Madden 07 and their single "Honestly" became a hit when it was played on New York City's hit music station, Z100. It was also featured in the 2006 film John Tucker Must Die.

Cartel (2007)
The second, self-titled album, was recorded and produced all in an MTV experiment called Band in a Bubble that was sponsored by Dr. Pepper. The band had twenty days to write and produce a full-length album while inside a bubble-shaped construction. The experiment was viewable 24/7 by fans through twenty-three web cams sponsored by Dr. Pepper. The selected twenty-three cameras coincided with Dr. Pepper's promotion of twenty-three flavors in its soft drink. The Band in a Bubble experiment was also a four-part mini-series on MTV. Cartel entered the bubble on May 24, 2007 and left twenty days later on June 12, 2007. Upon “breaking out” of the bubble the band put on a live concert featuring many of the new songs that had been recorded in the bubble.  The same day they “broke out” the single “Lose It” ft: Juliet Simms was released on iTunes and Napster. The complete album was released in August.

Cycles (2008–2010)
Cartel announced that they would be working on a new album during the summer of 2008. The group also announced their transition to Wind-up Records from their previous label Epic Records. The band also mentioned “I think we've written or entertained the idea of about 30 songs at this point”, The album saw the band continue their use of tight hooks and bass heavy tracks with "The Perfect Mistake", "Retrograde" and "Cycles." The band began the writing and recording stage in May 2009. On July 8, the band announced that the album would be called Cycles. The album's first single "Let's Go", was released digitally on July 28, 2009. On August 25, 2009 the band announced the track listing for the album and on September 6, "The Perfect Mistake" was released for digital download. The album's pre-order on iTunes also included a special, bonus song otherwise unavailable titled "In No Hurry.". Cycles was officially released on October 20, 2009. Their single "The Perfect Mistake" was featured in the pilot episode of The CW series Hellcats.

Following the release of Cycles, the band supported All Time Low, Boys Like Girls, Third Eye Blind, and LMFAO for part of The Bamboozle Roadshow 2010, along with numerous other supporting acts, including 3OH!3, Good Charlotte, Forever The Sickest Kids, and Simple Plan

In Stereo EP and the departure of Jeff Lett (2011–2012)
The single off the new EP, "Lessons in Love", was released on July 26, 2011; however the single was leaked online on July 22. The rest of the five song EP was released via iTunes, on October 4, 2011 to good reviews. On April 7, 2011, Cartel confirmed that bassist Jeff Lett has left the band to finish school. The band and Lett split on good terms and have left no grievances against each other. Nic Hudson has taken over Lett's role as bassist, and singer Will Pugh is now rhythm guitarist.

The band released a deluxe version of In Stereo via LAB Records in the UK & Europe on May 20, 2012. It featured the five original songs as well as acoustic versions and one unreleased track, "No Motivation".

Collider and Chroma anniversary tour (2012–2022) 
The band co-headlined a space tour in the spring. After which, singer/guitarist Will Pugh was available to produce artists/bands in the Atlanta area in the summer of 2012. On Facebook, the band also announced that they will be recording for their next, full-length album August 20, 2012. On January 20, 2013, the band announced that their new album would be titled Collider. The album was released on March 26, 2013.

From October 11, 2013 to November 30, 2013, Cartel headlined for Mayday Parade on their Glamour Kills tour along with bands Man Overboard and Stages & Stereos.

On July 24, 2014, the band tweeted that they are planning a 10-year anniversary tour for their debut album Chroma. The band was announced as one of the acts to perform in the South by So What?! festival in March at QuikTrip Park in Grand Prairie.

On February 2, 2015, the Chroma 10 Year Tour was officially announced on the band's official networks. They were joined by Hit The Lights, TEAM* and Driver Friendly on the selected dates, starting on March 20 with 24 dates in the United States, and one in London.

On April 19, 2015, the concert held on New York City for the Chroma tour was transmitted on live streaming by Yahoo! Screen, being available during the following 24 hours.

On December 21, 2015, the band released an acoustic album titled Bare Essentials, which included some of their more popular tracks, including "Honestly" and "Faster Ride".

In December 2016, the band members performed a DJ set at Emo Nite in Los Angeles.

Reunion and New Music (2022-present) 
Cartel supported Dashboard Confessional and Andrew McMahon in the Wilderness on select dates of the Hello Gone Days tour in the summer of 2022.

On July 15, 2022, the band released their first new single in nine years,"17", along with an accompanying lyric video. On August 18, 2022, they followed up with a second single, "The End".

Members
Current
Will Pugh – lead vocals  (2003–present) , rhythm guitar   (2003–2011), bass guitar  (2011–present) 
Joseph Pepper – lead guitar, backing vocals  (2003–present)
Nic Hudson – rhythm guitar  (2004–2011, 2013–present), bass guitar  (2011–2013),  backing vocals  (2004–present)  
Kevin Sanders – drums  (2003–present) 

Former
Jeff Lett – bass guitar, backing vocals  (2006–2011)
Ryan Roberts – bass guitar, (2003–2006) 
Andy Lee – rhythm guitar (2003–2004)

Timeline

Discography

Chroma (2005)
Cartel (2007)
Cycles (2009)
Collider (2013)

References

External links
 
 Cartel's profile at Buzznet
 Review of Cartel's new album 'Cycles'

Rock music groups from Georgia (U.S. state)
Musical groups from Atlanta
Musical groups established in 2003
American pop punk groups
Epic Records artists
Wind-up Records artists